Johann Nepomuk Fuchs may refer to:

Johann Nepomuk Fuchs (architect) (1727–1804), Lower Styrian church architect
Johann Nepomuk Fuchs (composer) (1842–1899), Austrian composer and conductor
Johann Nepomuk von Fuchs (1774–1856), German chemist and mineralogist, known as Johann Nepomuk Fuchs until 1854